Bainbridge High School may refer to two high schools:

 Bainbridge High School (Georgia)
 Bainbridge High School (Washington)